The Honningsvåg Tunnel is a road tunnel on the island of Magerøya in Nordkapp Municipality in Troms og Finnmark county, Norway. It is located slightly north of the undersea North Cape Tunnel, and it is part of the European route E69 highway.

This tunnel goes through a large mountain called "Honningsvågfjellet" west of the town of Honningsvåg. It is the northernmost public road tunnel in the world.

References

Road tunnels in Troms og Finnmark
1999 establishments in Norway
Tunnels completed in 1999
Nordkapp
Roads within the Arctic Circle